Ximbo is a traditional pit-barbecued pork dish from the Mexican states of Hidalgo and México. It originated in the Mezquital Valley, principally in San Salvador and Actopan municipalities. Ximbo is an Otomi word. It is generally made from pork, beef, pork cueritos, fish, and chicken fried in chili sauce with nopalitos, cumin, oregano, and onions. It is then wrapped in small packages made of century plant leaf.

See also
 Mixiote
 List of Mexican dishes

References

External links
recipe

Mexican cuisine
Pork dishes
Otomi